Daniel Westmattelmann (born 31 October 1987 in Ahlen) is a German road racing cyclist, who currently rides for German amateur team RSV Münster.

Major results
2008
 1st Time trial, National Universiade
2014
 4th Time trial, National Road Championships
2015
 8th Chrono des Nations
2016
 1st Chrono Champenois
 6th Chrono des Nations

References

External links

1987 births
Living people
German male cyclists
Universiade medalists in cycling
People from Ahlen
Sportspeople from Münster (region)
Universiade silver medalists for Germany
Medalists at the 2011 Summer Universiade
Cyclists from North Rhine-Westphalia